USP Leste is a train station belonging to CPTM Line 12-Sapphire, located in the city of São Paulo.

History
USP Leste station was construct to attend the new campus of University of São Paulo, located north to the station, in the district of Cangaíba, East Side of São Paulo.

References

Companhia Paulista de Trens Metropolitanos stations
Railway stations opened in 2009